Sir Charles Gounter Nicoll  KB (1704–24 November 1733), of Racton, Sussex, was a British politician who sat in the House of Commons from 1729 to 1733.

Gounter Nicoll, born Gounter was baptised on 7 October 1704, the eldest son of George Gounter, MP of Racton, and his wife Judith Nicoll, daughter of Richard Nicoll of Norbiton Place, Surrey. His grandfather,  Colonel George Gounter,  helped Charles II to escape from England after the battle of Worcester. Gounter succeeded his father to Racton in 1718. He matriculated at New College, Oxford on 4 April 1722, aged 17. In 1726, he changed his name by an Act of Parliament, adopting the surname of Nicoll, according to the deed of settlement of William Nicoll. He married Elizabeth Blundell, daughter of William Blundell of Basingstoke, Hampshire, whose mother Alice Blunden was the alleged victim of a notorious premature burial.

Gounter Nicoll was returned as Member of Parliament for Peterborough  at a by-election on 29 January 1729. He voted with the government and was knighted as Knight of the Order of the Bath on 30 June 1732.

Gounter Nicoll died on 24 November 1733, having had two daughters Elizabeth, and Frances Catherine and was buried in St Peter's Church in Racton. His widow prosecuted a journalist, soon after her husband's death, for defaming him for accepting KB. The cost of the prosecution was met from secret service funds. In 1735 she married Lord Lindsey, 3rd Duke of Ancaster with £70,000. Gounter Nicoll's daughter Frances Catherine married William Legge, 2nd Earl of Dartmouth with £100,000 in 1755.

Gounter Nicoll's last will and testament of 13 April 1731 names his mother as Judith Gounter, his sister Katharine as married to Sir Henry Maynard, nephew William Maynard, his Aunt Nicoll, and his Uncle William Wither and Wither's wife.

References

Knights Grand Cross of the Order of the Bath
Members of the Parliament of Great Britain for English constituencies
British MPs 1727–1734
1704 births
1733 deaths